Momsky District (Muoma uluuha) is an administrative and municipal district (raion, or ulus), one of the thirty-four in the Sakha Republic, Russia. It is located in the northeast of the republic. Its administrative center is the rural locality (a selo) of Khonuu. As of the 2010 Census, the total population of the district was 4,452, with the population of Khonuu accounting for 55.6% of that number.

Geography
The landscape of the district is mostly mountainous. The highest point of the Chersky Range, high Mount Pobeda, is located in the district. The main river in the district is the Indigirka with its tributaries the Moma and the Chibagalakh.

Climate

History
The district was established on May 20, 1931. Prior to that, its territory  was a part of Verkhoyansky District.

The Moma Natural Park, located in the Moma River valley and the Ulakhan-Chistay Range of the southern part of the district, is a major tourist attraction that was established on 18 June 1996.

Administrative and municipal status
Within the framework of administrative divisions, Momsky District is one of the thirty-four in the republic. The district is divided into six rural okrugs (naslegs) which comprise seven rural localities. As a municipal division, the district is incorporated as Momsky Municipal District. Its six rural okrugs are incorporated into six rural settlements within the municipal district. The selo of Khonuu serves as the administrative center of both the administrative and municipal district.

Inhabited localities

Economy
The economy of the district is mostly based on agriculture, including breeding of horses and cattle, fur farming, and reindeer herding.

Demographics 
As of the 2002 Census, the ethnic composition was as follows:
Yakuts: 70.0%
Russians: 9.1%
Evenks: 0.9%
Ukrainians: 0.8%
Yukaghir people: 0.3%
others ethnicities: 2.2%

References

Notes

Sources
Official website of the Sakha Republic. Registry of the Administrative-Territorial Divisions of the Sakha Republic. Momsky District 

Districts of the Sakha Republic